Battle of Mice was an American post-metal supergroup consisting of Julie Christmas (Made Out of Babies), Josh Graham (ex-Neurosis, ex-Red Sparowes, A Storm of Light), Joel Hamilton (Book of Knots), Tony Maimone (Book of Knots, Pere Ubu), and Joe Tomino (Fugees, Dub Trio, Peeping Tom).

The band was formed when vocalist Julie Christmas and guitarist/keyboardist Josh Graham met in Austin, Texas while touring with their respective bands in 2005. Graham and Christmas, who disliked one another upon first acquaintance, were in an on-again-off-again relationship during the recording of the band's debut album, A Day of Nights. At their worst, the pair refused to play in the same room.

The album, which was released under Neurot Recordings, contains seven tracks heavily influenced by the metal, post-rock and noise rock roots from which the group was derived. The song "At the Base of the Giant's Throat" features a recorded 911 call between vocal sections.

The band's name is derived from a saying by Alexander the Great pertaining to a military invasion of Crete.
 
On September 3, 2009, a blog was posted on the band's MySpace page stating that the band was parting ways.

Members
Julie Christmas (ex-Made Out of Babies) – vocals
Josh Graham (ex-Neurosis, ex-Red Sparowes, A Storm of Light) – guitars, keyboards, and vocals
Joel Hamilton (Book of Knots) – guitar
Tony Maimone (Book of Knots, Pere Ubu) – bass
Joe Tomino (Fugees, Dub Trio, Peeping Tom) – drums

Discography
Triad (split album) (2006)
A Day of Nights (2006)
Jesu / Battle of Mice (split EP) (2008)

References

External links
 Official band website
 www.myspace.com/BattleOfMice Battle of Mice at MySpace
 An interview with Josh Graham, March 2008
 Battle of Mice interview, avantgarde-metal.com, 2009

Musical groups established in 2005
Musical groups disestablished in 2009
Heavy metal musical groups from New York (state)
American post-metal musical groups
American sludge metal musical groups